Nova Vas pri Žireh is a formerly independent settlement in the Municipality of Žiri in western Slovenia. It is now part of the town of Žiri. It is part of the traditional region of Upper Carniola and is now included with the rest of the municipality in the Upper Carniola Statistical Region.

Geography
Nova Vas pri Žireh is an elongated village at the southeast edge of the Žiri Plain above the right bank of Račeva Creek. It lies along the road from Žiri to Smrečje. Kovtrovec Hill rises to the northeast and Goropeke Hill to the south.

Name
The name of the settlement was changed from Nova vas to Nova vas pri Žireh (i.e., 'Nova Vas near Žiri') in 1955 to distinguish the settlement from others sharing the same name. The name Nova vas (literally, 'new village') is relatively common in Slovenia, referring to a settlement that was established later than a neighboring one. In the case at hand, compare neighboring Stara Vas (literally, 'old village') immediately west of the settlement.

History
Nova Vas pri Žireh was annexed by Žiri in 1981, ending its existence as an independent settlement.

Notable people
Notable people that were born or lived in Nova Vas pri Žireh include:
France Kopač (sl) (1885–1941), painter

References

External links

Nova Vas pri Žireh on Geopedia

Populated places in the Municipality of Žiri
Former settlements in Slovenia